Southgate Centre is a shopping centre located in south Edmonton, Alberta, Canada, covering just under 90,000 square metres. It contains 165 retailers including The Bay, Aritzia, Zara, Michael Kors, Browns Shoes and Edmonton's only Restoration Hardware and Crate & Barrel. Apple opened a second store in Edmonton at Southgate Centre on May 28, 2010, Edmonton's first Lego store opened in June 2013, London Drugs moved up 51 Avenue from 105 Street in fall of 2022, and Edmonton's sixth H&M location opened in fall of 2022. The centre is located adjacent to Whitemud Drive and 111 Street, and is located across from a transit bus station and the Southgate LRT Station.

Following major expansion, the mall marked its reopening in August 2009, including a new food court and added parking. These expansions included 40 new stores under a new two-level parking deck and a station on the expansion of the Edmonton Light Rail Transit system, whose opening ceremony was on April 24, 2010. An Edmonton Public Library branch operated until 2002, when it relocated to nearby Whitemud Crossing.

The mall is owned by Ivanhoé Cambridge, a subsidiary of the Caisse de dépôt et placement du Québec.

The mall is currently undergoing a $93 million expansion which will see the former Sears space repurposed as a new mall common area with three floors, with a London Drugs and H&M, which was almost completed in 2022 and will be completed in 2023.

Anchors 
As of August 2022 the mall has two anchor tenants:
Hudson's Bay  opened with the mall in 1970
American Eagle

Former tenants 
Coles Books Closed, replaced by Sporting Life, Coles, moved to former Below the Belt location in the food court and rebranded to !ndigoSpirit
Sears Canada  (2000-2018) former Woodward's/Eaton's, opened September 1, 2000, closed January 8, 2018, replaced with Big Comfort on July 21, 2018-Now Closed
Edmonton Public Library (Basement Level) – closed 2002, now Dollarama
Eatons (1993-1999) – closed 1999, replaced with Sears Canada in 2000
Woodward's (1970-1993) – opened with the mall in 1970, closed 1993-replaced with Eatons which closed in 1999
Woodward's Food Floor (1970-1993) - opened with the mall in 1970, closed 1993, replaced with Safeway
Big Comfort - former Woodward's/Eaton's/Sears, opened on July 21, 2018 for a short time, now closed. Replaced with rebuilt mall space which includes London Drugs and H&M

History and anniversary
On August 12, 2010, Southgate celebrated the 40th anniversary of its opening. When the centre opened with Woodward's, Woodward's Food Floor and The Bay, it was at the time the largest shopping centre west of Toronto and the first centre built in Alberta that housed two anchor department stores.  In 1993, Woodward's went bankrupt; its space was converted to Eaton's, which left Heritage Mall.  In addition, Safeway occupied the food floor of the former Woodward's. By 1999, Eaton's went bankrupt and its space became a Sears the following year.

References

External links
 
 Ivanhoé Cambridge Leasing Fact Page

Shopping malls in Edmonton
Shopping malls established in 1970
Tourist attractions in Edmonton
Ivanhoé Cambridge